Four and a half LIM domains protein 1 is a protein that in humans is encoded by the FHL1 gene.

Structure 

LIM proteins, named for 'LIN11, ISL1, and MEC3,' are defined by the possession of a highly conserved double zinc finger motif called the LIM domain.

Role in muscle disorders 

FHL1 has been shown to be heavily expressed in skeletal and cardiac muscles. In 2008 this was borne out by the discovery that defects in the FHL1 gene are responsible for a number of Muscular dystrophy-like muscle disorders, ranging from severe, childhood onset diseases through to adult-onset disorders similar to Limb girdle muscular dystrophy. At least 15 disease-causing mutations in this gene have been discovered. At present different research groups are using different terminology for these disorders, which include:

 X-linked myopathy with postural muscle atrophy (XMPMA) An adult-onset muscle disorder known to affect families in Austria and the UK.

 Reducing body myopathy (RBM) A rare disorder causing progressive muscular weakness characterized by aggresome-like inclusions in the myofibrils. The effects of the disorder can be either severe, with onset of weakness at approximately five years, or adult onset, with weakness occurring in the late 20s, early 30s.

 Scapuloperoneal (SP) syndrome Another adult-onset muscle disorder, especially affecting the shoulder girdle and legs.

References

Further reading

External links 
  GeneReviews/NCBI/NIH/UW entry on Emery–Dreifuss muscular dystrophy
 

Transcription factors